Vicente Paúl Ambrosi Zambrano, commonly known as Paúl Ambrosi (born October 14, 1980, in Guaranda), is a retired Ecuadorian football player who played as a defender. He has spent the vast majority of his professional career at LDU Quito. He is of Italian descent from his grandparents.

Club career 
Ambrosi has played for LDU Quito for most of his career. On the national level, he has helped LDU Quito win three Serie A national championships, and one Serie B title. In 2008, he was a starting player on the squad that won the Copa Libertadores, the first for the club and for the country. In August 2009, he signed with Argentine club Rosario Central. He returned to LDU Quito after one season with Rosario Central.

International career 
Ambrosi was first called up to play for the Ecuador national team on August 20, 2003, in a game friendly against Guatemala. Since then, he has become a regular fixture on the team as a starter and a substitute, playing in the 2004 Copa América, 2006 World Cup, and in the 2010 World Cup qualifiers.

Honors
LDU Quito
Serie A: 2003, 2005 A, 2007, 2010
Copa Libertadores: 2008
Recopa Sudamericana: 2009

References

External links
FEF player card 

 ESPN statistics
 Primera División statistics

1980 births
Living people
People from Guaranda
Ecuadorian people of Italian descent
Association football fullbacks
Ecuadorian footballers
Ecuadorian expatriate footballers
Ecuador international footballers
L.D.U. Quito footballers
Rosario Central footballers
Cerro Porteño players
C.D. Olmedo footballers
Copa Libertadores-winning players
Ecuadorian expatriate sportspeople in Argentina
Expatriate footballers in Argentina
Expatriate footballers in Paraguay
Ecuadorian expatriate sportspeople in Paraguay
2004 Copa América players
2006 FIFA World Cup players
Argentine Primera División players
Ecuadorian Serie A players